Farsovsky is a rural locality (a khutor) in Sergiyevskoye Rural Settlement of Giaginsky District, Adygea, Russia. The population of this village was 11 as of 2018.

Geography 
The khutor is located on the right bank of the Fars River, 42 km southeast of Giaginskaya (the district's administrative centre) by road. Tambovsky is the nearest rural locality.

Ethnicity 
The khutor is inhabited by Russians.

References 

Rural localities in Giaginsky District